The Central Youth Hall(청년중앙회관) is a social education center located in North Korea, opened on 18 May 1989 for the 13th World Festival of Youth and Students.

The building houses a variety of functions including two theatres (2,000 and 600 seats), a multipurpose hall for 1,000, four large meeting rooms for 250 people; in total a total of 760 rooms covering 59,900 sq m.

See also 

 List of theatres in North Korea

References 

Theatres in North Korea
1989 establishments in North Korea
Event venues established in 1989
Theatres completed in 1989
Buildings and structures in Pyongyang